Bilje is a municipality in the Baranja region of Osijek-Baranja County, in north-eastern Croatia. It is 5 km northeast of Osijek, on the edge of the Kopački Rit nature park.

Name

Its name derived from the Slavic word "bilje" ("herb" in English). In German the village is known as Belje, in Hungarian as Bellye, and in Serbian Cyrillic as Биље.

Geography

The municipality of Bilje include following settlements and population (2011 census):
Bilje - 3,613
 Kopačevo - 559
 Kozjak - 69
 Lug - 764
 Podunavlje - 1
 Tikveš - 10
 Vardarac - 630
 Zlatna Greda - 5

Demographics

There are 5,642 inhabitants in the municipality (2011 census), including:
62.87% Croats
29.62% Hungarians
3.83% Serbs
1.05% Germans
0.71% Romani

History
In the late 19th and early 20th century, Bilje was part of the Baranya County of the Kingdom of Hungary.

References

Municipalities of Osijek-Baranja County
Baranya (region)
Hungarian-speaking territorial units in Croatia